KCCB (1260 AM) is a radio station broadcasting a jazz format. Licensed to Corning, Arkansas, United States, the station is currently owned by Shields-Adkins Broadcasting.

References

External links

CCB